The 1963 All-Ireland Senior Camogie Championship Final was the 32nd All-Ireland Final and the deciding match of the 1963 All-Ireland Senior Camogie Championship, an inter-county camogie tournament for the top teams in Ireland.

Dublin led 3-1 to 1-2 at half-time, mainly due to poor Antrim shooting.Bríd Keenan scored three second-half goals and won by double scores.

References

All-Ireland Senior Camogie Championship Finals
Camogie
All-Ireland Senior Camogie Championship Final
All-Ireland Senior Camogie Championship Final
All-Ireland Senior Camogie Championship Final, 1963
Dublin county camogie team matches